The Adventurers' Act is an Act of the Parliament of England which specified its aim as "the speedy and effectual reducing of the rebels in His Majesty's Kingdom of Ireland".

The Irish Rebellion of 1641 had broken out five months earlier, and the Act was designed to pay the army needed to subdue the rebellion by using borrowed money. Repayment would come from confiscating the rebels' lands and selling them.

The main Act
It was passed by the Long Parliament on 19 March 1642 as a way of raising funds to suppress the Irish Rebellion of 1641. The Act invited members of the public to invest £200 for which they would receive  of lands that would be confiscated from rebels in Ireland.  of Irish land were set aside by the English government for this purpose.

The enactment was done at the request of King Charles in the House of Lords, joined by the Commons, and was unanimously accepted, without any debate. The Bill had been placed before the Houses for inspection but was not formally read into the record. The title of the Act – "An Act for the speedy and effectual reducing of the Rebels, in His Majesty's Kingdom of Ireland, to their due Obedience to His Majesty, and the Crown of England" – was read out to Parliament, followed by the statement: "le roy le veult".

The "Adventurers" were so called because they were risking their money at a time when the Crown had just had to pay for the Bishops' Wars in 1639–40. "Reducing" the rebels meant leading them back (Latin: reducere) to the legal concept of the "King's Peace". King Charles could not subsequently enforce the Act, but it was realised by his political opponents following the Cromwellian conquest of Ireland in 1649–1653, and formed the main legal basis for the contentious Act for the Settlement of Ireland 1652.

Ironically, in May 1642 the Confederate Irish rebels drafted the Confederate Oath of Association that recognised Charles as their monarch.

Auxiliary Acts
The Adventurers' Act was extended and amended by three other acts the Lands of Irish Rebels; Adventurers' Subscriptions Act 1640 (c. 34), Lands of Irish Rebels; Adventurers' Subscriptions Act 1640 (c. 35), and Irish Rebels Act 1640 (c. 37). All four received royal assent in the summer of 1642, just before the start of the English Civil War, but are usually referred to as 1640 acts—the year the Long Parliament started to sit—and as that year was the 16th year of Charles I's reign are formally known as 16 Cha. I c.33 etc.

In July 1643, Parliament passed the Doubling Ordinance which doubled the allocation of land to anyone who increased their original investment by 25%. The purpose of the Act was twofold, firstly to raise money for Parliament to help suppress the rebellion in Ireland, and secondly to deprive the King of the lands seized from rebels that would be his by prerogative.

Enforcement
To enforce the Acts the Cromwellian conquest of Ireland was launched in 1649. In 1653, Ireland was declared subdued and the lands were allocated to the subscribers in what became known as the Cromwellian Settlement.

Repeal
The Adventurers Act, and the other three statutes (c.33 to 35, and 37), were repealed as regards the United Kingdom by the Statute Law Revision Act 1950. As regards the Republic of Ireland they were repealed by the Statute Law Revision Act 2007.

See also
Act for the Settlement of Ireland 1652
Act of Settlement 1657
Act of Settlement 1662
Confederate Ireland

References

1642 in law
1642 in England
1642 in Ireland
Acts of the Parliament of England
Irish Rebellion of 1641
England–Ireland relations